SPINE stands for strep–protein interaction experiment. SPINE is a powerful tool to detect protein–protein interactions in vivo. The bait protein has to be expressed with a Strep-tag under the conditions when the potential interaction partners are presumably present in the cells. The addition of formaldehyde links the bait  protein to its potential interaction partners. The bait protein together with its potential interaction partners can then be isolated using a Strep-Tactin Sepharose column. The cross-links between the bait protein and the potential interaction partner can be  cleaved by heating the samples in Laemmli buffer. Finally, the co-purified interaction partner can be separated by SDS PAGE and identified by mass spectrometry.

References 
 Herzberg C, Weidinger LA, Dörrbecker B, Hübner S, Stülke J and Commichau FM (2007). SPINE: A method for the rapid detection and analysis of protein–protein interactions in vivo. Proteomics 7(22):4032-4035
 Müller VS, Jungblut PR, Meyer TF, Hunke S (2011). Membrane-SPINE: an improved method to identify protein–protein interaction partners of membrane proteins in vivo. Proteomics 11(10):2124-2128
 Müller VS, Tschauner K, Hunke S (2013). Membrane-SPINE: a biochemical tool to identify protein–protein interactions of membrane proteins in vivo. J Vis Exp 7(81):e50810

Protein–protein interaction assays